Hanggang Saan (International title: A Mother's Guilt / ) is a 2017 Philippine family drama television series starring real life mother and son Sylvia Sanchez & Arjo Atayde, together with Sue Ramirez, Maris Racal and Yves Flores. The show was aired on ABS-CBN's Kapamilya Gold afternoon block and worldwide on The Filipino Channel from November 27, 2017 to April 27, 2018, replacing The Promise of Forever.

The story introduces Sonya (Sanchez), a brave mother who will do everything to give her sons a good life. They will also meet mother and daughter Jean (Loyzaga) and Anna (Ramirez), who will become their closest friends and change their lives. Sonya gets herself in a perilous situation where she kills an innocent man in order to prolong the life of her son, Paco (Atayde). How far would a mother go to love and protect the life of her child?

Series overview

Episodes

Book 1
</onlyinclude>

Book 2
</onlyinclude>

References

Lists of Philippine drama television series episodes